The Brisbane Entertainment Centre is a multi-purpose indoor arena located in the Brisbane suburb of Boondall, Queensland, Australia. The centre is managed by ASM Global.

The arena has an array of seating plans which facilitate the comfort of its users, subject to performance. Specific seating plans are usually allocated, depending on the performance and the size of its audience. The general seating arrangements are end stage mode, "in the round" and intimate mode, which only uses half of the arena. The centre also houses a sporting complex and small function rooms which are available to hire for wedding reception and business functions.

The centre's large audience capacity is mostly used for the staging of concerts and musical theatre shows, including Whitney Houston’s Nothing But Love World Tour, Kanye West's Glow in the Dark Tour, One Direction's Take Me Home Tour, Taylor Swift's Fearless and Speak Now Tours, Grease, Beauty and the Beast, and The Man from Snowy River: Arena Spectacular. It has also staged ice-skating shows, including Disney On Ice. The Entertainment Centre was also the filming venue for the original Australian series of Gladiators from 1995 to 1997.

Location and access
Located in Boondall, just off the Gateway Motorway, patrons can catch a Queensland Rail City network service to Boondall railway station, on the Shorncliffe railway line, or travel by taxi. There are 4,000 car parking spaces. Buses do not run to the centre even on event nights.

Venue layout  

The centre has 11,000 tiered seats and a maximum concert capacity of 13,601 making it the largest indoor live entertainment arena in Brisbane and the second largest permanent indoor arena in Australia behind only the 21,000 capacity Sydney Super Dome (it is smaller than the 14,820 seat Rod Laver Arena and the 14,856 seat Perth Arena, though both of those venues have a retractable roof). It cost $71 million to construct.

Sports

Brisbane Bullets
From 1986 to 1997, the BEC was home to former National Basketball League Australia(NBL) team the Brisbane Bullets.

The Bullets won the 1987 NBL championship against the Perth Wildcats, and secured their second NBL championship at this venue as they completed a two-game sweep of the Wildcats 2-0 after winning the first game which was played at the Perth Superdome.

In 1987, the Brisbane Bullets won their second NBL championship and their first at the Entertainment Centre with a 2–0 series win over the Perth Wildcats (the Bullets previous championship win in 1985 was at the Sleeman Sports Centre).

In 1990, the Brisbane Bullets hosted games 2 and 3 of the National Basketball League Grand Final series against the Perth Wildcats, setting a new NBL attendance record for the time in Australia of 13,221 for game 2.

In 2007, the Brisbane Bullets won their third and last NBL championship when they defeated the Melbourne Tigers 3–1 in their best of five-game series. The Entertainment Centre was used due to a date clash with the Bullets then home, the Brisbane Convention & Exhibition Centre.

The Brisbane Bullets returned to the NBL in 2016–17 and will again play some games at the Brisbane Entertainment Centre.

Queensland Firebirds
The venue was the main home court for netball side the Queensland Firebirds, who won premierships in the ANZ Championship at the venue in 2015 and 2016. In 2019, the club moved all of their home matches to the newly constructed venue dedicated to netball, Brisbane Arena.

Other
The facility co-hosted the FIBA Oceania Championship in 2007 and 2011. Both times, the Australian national basketball team won the gold medal.

Notable events

The opening event for the centre was on 20 February 1986, featuring world champion British ice skaters Torvill and Dean. Ticket prices were adults $22.90 and juniors $15.90

In 1987, Michael Jackson performed during his Bad Tour for two sold-out shows on 27 and 28 November. On the 28th, Stevie Wonder appeared on stage and sang with Jackson.

See also

Popular entertainment in Brisbane
List of indoor arenas in Australia

References

External links

Information about the BEC by the Queensland Government

Music venues in Australia
Netball venues in Queensland
Basketball venues in Australia
Brisbane Bullets
Indoor arenas in Australia
Tourist attractions in Brisbane
Music venues completed in 1986
Sports venues completed in 1986
Boxing venues in Australia
Sports venues in Brisbane
Defunct National Basketball League (Australia) venues
1986 establishments in Australia
Boondall, Queensland
Venues of the 2032 Summer Olympics and Paralympics